The 1928 Iowa gubernatorial election was held on November 6, 1928. Incumbent Republican John Hammill defeated Democratic nominee L. W. Housel with 62.79% of the vote.

General election

Candidates
John Hammill, Republican
L. W. Housel, Democratic

Results

References

1928
Iowa
Gubernatorial